Atanda Ayila Yussuf (born 4 November 1984) is a Nigerian former professional footballer who played as a central defender or defensive midfielder. A former Nigerian youth international player, Yussuf moved to Ukrainian Premier League Dynamo Kyiv from Nigerian side Union Bank in 2003. Despite injuries, Yussuf became a regular for both Dynamo Kyiv and the Nigeria national team. He joined Metalist Kharkiv on loan in 2014.

Club career

Early career 
At 16 years of age, Yussuf signed his first professional contract with Enyimba International he then continued his career with Union Bank his selection in senior teams drew the attention of the youth national team coaches.

Dynamo Kyiv 
After drawing interest from clubs like PSV Eindhoven and VfB Stuttgart, Yussuf signed with Dynamo Kyiv in July 2003. On 5 August, he made his debut in the club's reserve team, FC Dynamo-2 Kyiv, against FC Polissya Zhytomyr. Less than two months later, on 21 September, Yussef made his senior team debut against Zirka Kirovohrad. A serious knee injury ended his 2003–04 season. On 16 September 2004, he made his first appearance in the UEFA Champions League for FC Dynamo Kyiv in a match against Roma.

Since the second half of the 2011–12 season, Yussuf has struggled to maintain a place in the first team and was loaned to Turkish Süper Lig side Orduspor on 31 January 2013. After a loan spell in Turkey, he still had not regained a first-team spot and played for the reserve team of Dynamo Kyiv, Dynamo-2 Kyiv. On 18 February 2014, he joined league rivals Metalist Kharkiv on a loan deal until the end of the year.

Career statistics

References

External links
 Dynamo Kyiv profile
 
 

1984 births
Living people
Sportspeople from Lagos
Nigerian Muslims
Nigerian footballers
Association football midfielders
Nigeria international footballers
2006 Africa Cup of Nations players
2010 Africa Cup of Nations players
2010 FIFA World Cup players
Ukrainian Premier League players
Ukrainian First League players
Union Bank F.C. players
FC Dynamo Kyiv players
FC Dynamo-2 Kyiv players
FC Metalist Kharkiv players
Süper Lig players
Orduspor footballers
Nigerian expatriate footballers
Nigerian expatriate sportspeople in Ukraine
Expatriate footballers in Ukraine
Nigerian expatriate sportspeople in Turkey
Expatriate footballers in Turkey